The 614th Radar Squadron is an inactive United States Air Force unit. It was last assigned to the Washington Air Defense Sector, Air Defense Command, stationed at Cherry Point Marine Corps Air Station, North Carolina. It was discontinued on 1 August 1963.

The unit was a General Surveillance Radar squadron providing for the air defense of the United States.

Lineage
 Constituted as the 614th Aircraft Control and Warning Squadron, 1946
 Activated on or about 1 August 1946
 Redesignated: 614th Radar Squadron (SAGE), 1 March 1963
 Discontinued and inactivated on 1 August 1963

Assignments
 526th Aircraft Control & Warning Group, on or about 1 August 1946
 Pacific Air Command, on or about 1 December 1948
 1500 Air Base Group, 1 Jun 1949
 Eastern Air Defense Force, 1 July 1952
 32d Air Division, 1 December 1952
 4704th Defense Wing, 16 February 1953
 35th Air Division, 24 December 1953
 85th Air Division, 1 July 1956
 35th Air Division, 1 September 1958
 32d Air Division, 15 November 1958
 Washington Air Defense Sector, 1 July 1961

Stations
 Fort Shafter, Hawaii circa 1 August 1946
 Hickam AFB, Hawaii Territory, 7 February 1949
 Grenier AFB*, New Hampshire, 1 July 1952
 Dobbins AFB*, Georgia, 24 December 1953
 Andrews AFB*, Maryland, 1 July 1956
 Cherry Point Marine Corps Air Station, 1 July 1957 – 1 August 1963

.* Unit not manned or equipped

References

External links

 http://www.military.com/Resources/ReunionDisplay/1,11584,96663-838968,00.html

Radar squadrons of the United States Air Force
Aerospace Defense Command units